Sophie Noel Reiser (born December 21, 1987) is an American soccer midfielder for the Seattle Sounders Women of the United Soccer Leagues W-League.

Reiser attended Columbia University and was named  Ivy League Player of the Year in 2008. She played for the US WNT U-23 team  and was drafted to the WPS Chicago Red Stars in 2010.

References

External links 
 Sounders Women 2012 Roster
 Columbia player profile

Living people
Seattle Sounders Women players
USL W-League (1995–2015) players
1987 births
Chicago Red Stars players
Women's association football midfielders
American women's soccer players
Columbia Lions women's soccer players
Women's Professional Soccer players